Bartolomé Antonio de la Concepción Salom Borges (Puerto Cabello, August 24, 1780 – October 30, 1863) was a Venezuelan-born general and patriotic leader in the Venezuelan War of Independence. He is considered a national hero in Venezuela and Peru.

References

1780 births
1863 deaths
Venezuelan people of Spanish descent
Venezuelan people of Canarian descent